
"Homecoming" is a 1968 poem by Bruce Dawe. Written as an elegy for anonymous soldiers, "Homecoming" is an anti-war poem protesting Australia's involvement in the Vietnam War during the 1960s. Dennis Haskell, Winthrop Professor of English and Cultural Studies at University of Western Australia, has called it "the most highly regarded poem about Vietnam written by any Australian", and Peter Pierce, the editor of The Cambridge History of Australian Literature has described it as "one of the finest threnodies in the war literature of Vietnam".
 
The anti-war sentiment in "Homecoming" is more direct than in Dawe's other well-known war poem, "Weapons Training", written two years later. The ironic use of the word homecoming, with its usual connotations of celebration, as the title becomes apparent on reading the poem, in which the acts of collecting and processing the bodies of the war dead and shipping them home are described in a highly repetitive fashion, with a rhythm that evokes the beat of a funeral drum. Although the poem was written in 1968, the year Dawe left the Royal Australian Air Force, it had its origins, according to Dawe's biographer Peter Kuch, in Dawe's earlier "political awakening in Melbourne in the mid-1950s" and in particular his personal reaction to the fall of Dien Bien Phu in 1954. Before joining the RAAF, Dawe had worked as a postman. John Kinsella has proposed that Dawe's experiences during that time are echoed in the final lines of "Homecoming":
 

"Homecoming" is included in the 1971 collection of Dawe's poetry Condolences of the Season and in his Sometimes Gladness: Collected Poems, 1954–1992. It also appears in several anthologies of Australian literature, including Two Centuries of Australian Poetry (Oxford University Press, 1988) and The Macmillan Anthology of Australian Literature (Macmillan, 1990).

Notes and references

Sources

Astley, Thea (1979). Three Australian Writers: Essays on Bruce Dawe, Barbara Baynton, and Patrick White. Townsville Foundation for Australian Literary Studies
Haskell, Dennis (2002). Attuned to Alien Moonlight: The Poetry of Bruce Dawe, Univ. of Queensland Press. 
Kinsella, John (2008). Contrary Rhetoric: Lectures on Landscape and Language. Fremantle Press. 
Kuch, Peter (1995). Bruce Dawe Oxford University Press. 
Pierce, Peter (2002). "Australian and American literature of the Vietnam War" in Australia's Vietnam War, pp. 110–135. Texas A&M University Press. 
Wheeler, David (2011). "Two Australian poems: 'Trains' by Judith Wright and 'Homecoming' by Bruce Dawe'" in The Imperial Nightmare: Studies in English Literature, pp. 123–124. GRIN Verlag.

Further reading

Headon, David (1978). "The Quick and the Dead: The Breadth of Australia's Poetry in the Last Decade". Rocky Mountain Review of Language and Literature, Vol. 32, No. 2 (Spring, 1978), pp. 93–119

External links
Complete text of "Homecoming" published in Flanagan, Martin (16 May 1989). "Voice of people's poet in touch with the real world". The Age

Australian poems
Vietnam War poems
Anti-war works
Laments